The non-marine molluscs of Guadeloupe are a part of the molluscan fauna of Guadeloupe (wildlife of Guadeloupe). Guadeloupe is a Caribbean island in the Lesser Antilles. A number of species of non-marine molluscs are found in the wild in Guadeloupe.

Freshwater gastropods 
Ampullariidae
 
 
 Marisa cornuarietis (Linnaeus, 1758)
 Pomacea glauca (Linnaeus, 1758)

Ancylidae
 Gundlachia radiata (Guilding, 1828)

Bulinidae
 Plesiophysa granulata (Shuttleworth in Sowerby, 1873)
 Plesiophysa guadeloupensis ("Fischer" Mazé, 1883)

Hydrobiidae

 Potamopyrgus coronatus (Pfeiffer, 1840)
 Pygophorus parvulus (Guilding, 1828)
 
Lymnaeidae
 Lymnaea cubensis Pfeiffer, 1839

Neritidae

 Neritina punctulata Lamarck, 1816
 Neritina succinea Recluz, 1841
 Neritina virginea (Linnaeus, 1758)

Planorbidae

 Biomphalaria glabrata (Say, 1818)
 Biomphalaria schrammi (Crosse, 1864)
 Biomphalaria straminea (Dunker, 1848)<ref>Pointier, J.P., Lobato-Paraense, W. and Mazille, V. 1993: Introduction and spreading of Biomphalaria straminea (Dunker, 1848) (Mollusca: Pulmonata: Planorbidae) in Guadeloupe, French West Indies. Mem. Inst. Oswaldo Cruz, Rio de Janeiro 88(3):449-455. PDF</ref>
 Drepanotrema aeruginosum (Morelet, 1851)
 Drepanotrema anatinum (d´Orbigny, 1835)
 Drepanotrema cimex (Monicand, 1837)
 Drepanotrema depressissimum (Moricand, 1839)
 Drepanotrema kermatoides (d´Orbigny, 1835)
 Drepanotrema lucidum (Pfeiffer, 1839)
 Gundlachia radiata (Guilding, 1828)
 Helisoma duryi (Wethrby, 1879)
 Helisoma foveale (Menke, 1830)
 Plesiophysa granulata (Shuttleworth in Sowerby, 1873)
 Plesiophysa guadeloupensis ("Fischer" Mazé, 1883)

Physidae
 Aplexa marmorata Guilding, 1828
 Physa cubensis Pfeiffer, 1839

Thiaridae
 Melanoides tuberculata (Müller, 1774)

 Land gastropods 

Achatinidae
 Achatina fulica Bowdich, 1822

Annulariidae
 Chondropoma crenulatum (Potiez & Michaud, 1838)
 Chondropoma julieni Pfeiffer, 1866

Amphibulimidae

 Amphibulima patula (Bruguière, 1789)
 Amphibulima rubescens (Deshayes, 1830)

Bulimulidae

 Bulimulus diaphanus (Pfeiffer, 1855)
 Bulimulus cf. eyriesii (Drouët, 1859)
 Bulimulus guadalupensis (Bruguière, 1789)
 Bulimulus iherminieri (Fischer, 1857)
 Bulimulus limnoides (Férussac, 1832)
 Drymaeus elongatus (Röding, 1798)
 Drymaeus multifaciatus (Lamarck, 1822)
 Naesiotus chrysalis (Pfeiffer, 1847)
 Pellicula depressa Rang, 1853

Euconulidae
 Guppya (Guppya) gunddlachi (Pfeiffer, 1840)

Ferussaciidae
 Geostilbia consobrina (d´Orbigny, 1845) 
 Geostilbia gundlachi Pfeiffer, 1850

Gastrodontidae

 Zonitoides arboreus (say, 1816)

Helicinidae
 Alcadia guadaloupensis (Sowerby, 1842)
 Alcadia schrammi (Crosse, 1872)
 Helicina convexa Pfeiffer, 1848
 Helicina fasciata Lamarck, 1822
 Lucidella plicatula (Pfeiffer, 1848)

Hydrocenidae

 Hydrocena dubiosa (C.B. Adams, 1851)

Neocyclotidae = (Poteridae)
 Amphicyclotulus beauianus (Petit, 1853)
 Amphicyclotulus guadeloupensis de la Torre, Bartsch & Morrison, 1942
 Amphicyclotulus perplexus de la Torre, Bartsch & Morrison, 1942
 Amphicyclotulus schrammi (Shuttleworth, 1857)

Oleacinidae
 Lavadicella guadeloupensis (Pfeiffer, 1856) - endemic, extinctBouchet P. (1996). Oleacina guadeloupensis. 2006 IUCN Red List of Threatened Species. Downloaded on 7 August 2007.

Pleurodontidae
 Pleurodonte dentiens (Férussac, 1822)
 Pleurodonte josephinae (Férussac, 1832)
 Pleurodonte lychnuchus (Müller, 1774)
 Pleurodonte orbiculata (Férussac, 1822)
 Pleurodonte pachygastra (Gray, 1834)

Pupillidae

 Pupoides marginatus (Say, 1821)

Subulinidae
 Beckianum beckianum (Pfeiffer, 1849)
 Lamellaxis micra (Houton, 1834)
 Leptinaria lamellata (Potiez & Michaud, 1838)
 Obeliscus swiftianus (Pfeiffer, 1852)
 Opeas pumillum (Pfeiffer, 1840)
 Subulina octona (Bruguière, 1789)

Succineidae

 Succinea approximans Shuttleworth, 1854
 Succinea candeana Lea, 1841
 Omalonyx matheronii (Potiez & Michaud, 1838)

Systrophiidae
 Moerchia baudoni (Petit, 1853)

Truncatellidae
 Truncatella bilabiada  Pfeiffer, 1840

Thysanophoridae
 Thysanophora vortex  (Pfeiffer, 1839)

Urocoptidae
 Brachypodella collaris (Férussac, 1821)
 Pseudopineria viequensis (Pfeiffer, 1856)

Veronicellidae
 Vaginula occidentalis (Guilding, 1824)
 Sarasinula marginata (Semper, 1885)

Vertiginidae
 Gastrocopta servilis (Gould, 1843)
 Vertigo ovata Say, 1822

Bivalvia
Sphaeriidae
 Eupera viridans (Prime 1875)
 Pisidium punctiferum'' (Guppy, 1867)

See also
 List of marine molluscs of Guadeloupe

Lists of molluscs of surrounding countries:
 List of non-marine molluscs of Dominica
 List of non-marine molluscs of Antigua and Barbuda, Wildlife of Antigua and Barbuda
 List of non-marine molluscs of Montserrat, Wildlife of Montserrat

References

molluscs, non-marine
Lists of biota of Guadeloupe
Guadeloupe
Guadeloupe
Guadeloupe